Come into My Heart is a 1978 album by USA European Connection. It was written and produced by Boris Midney. All of the tracks reached number one on the disco chart for two weeks and stayed there for more than five months.

The album peaked at #66 on the Billboard 200 chart.

Critical reception
AllMusic wrote that "lovers of exotic hand-dancing enjoyed this kind of music ... For soul and rock afficionados, [sic] however, the whole ordeal comes off rather bland."

Track listing

References

1978 albums